The Wrexham and Denbigh Weekly Advertiser (established in March 1854) was a weekly English language newspaper in Wales.

It contained local news and information from north-east Wales and the border area. Although it claimed no political allegiance, it supported the Liberal party. It was published by George Bayley.

The Wrexham and Denbigh Weekly Advertiser was a successor to the fortnightly Wrexham Advertiser (1850-1854) and the monthly Wrexham Registrar (1848–49).

The first issue appeared on Saturday 11 March 1854 with the title Wrexham and Denbigh Weekly Advertiser, and Cheshire, Shropshire, Denbighshire, Flintshire, and North Wales Chronicle. it was a four-page broadsheet, priced 2d., 3d. if stamped.

The title changed from the Wrexham and Denbigh Weekly Advertiser to the Wrexham and Denbighshire Weekly Advertiser on 2 February 1856. In February 1863 it became the Wrexham Advertiser and Denbighshire, Cheshire, Shropshire and North Wales Register.

Circulation

1857 - 550 copies per week

1859 - 2,000 copies per week

Rivals

The Wrexham and Denbigh Weekly Advertiser had a rival in the Conservative-supporting Wrexham Albion (1854), later the Wrexhamite (1855-1857).

References

Newspapers published in Wales